Jon Gunnarsson Helland (1897–1977) was a Norwegian Hardanger fiddle maker from Bø in Telemark, Norway.

John Gunnarson Helland, was the fourth of the five Gunnar Olavsson Helland sons. He began work in his father's workshop and then went to Notodden, Telemark, where he made some of his best fiddles.

From 1917 to 1927, he travelled in Sweden and Germany. He later operated a workshop for fiddles and violins and a music shop in Skien.

See also
Helland (fiddle makers)

External links
The Helland fiddle maker family

1897 births
1977 deaths
Norwegian musical instrument makers
Fiddle makers